The Greensburg-Salem School District is a public school district in Westmoreland County, Pennsylvania. The City of Greensburg as well as South Greensburg Boro, Southwest Greensburg Boro, and Salem Township are within district boundaries.

The district is starting to add in more STEAM education.

Schools
There are three K–5 elementary schools, the 6–8 Greensburg-Salem Middle School and the 9–12 Greensburg-Salem High School.

Elementary schools 
Amos K. Hutchinson Elementary School
810 Welty Street
Greensburg, Pennsylvania 15601

James H. Metzger Elementary School
140 C.C. Hall Drive
New Alexandria, Pennsylvania 15670

Robert F. Nicely Elementary School
55 McLaughlin Drive
Greensburg, Pennsylvania 15601

Middle school
Greensburg Salem Middle School
301 North Main Street
Greensburg, Pennsylvania 15601

High school
Greensburg-Salem High School
65 Mennel Drive
Greensburg, Pennsylvania 15601

References

External links
 

School districts in Westmoreland County, Pennsylvania
Greensburg, Pennsylvania